The 1888 North Carolina gubernatorial election was held on November 6, 1888. Democratic nominee Daniel Gould Fowle defeated Republican nominee Oliver H. Dockery with 51.97% of the vote.

Democratic convention
The Democratic convention was held on May 30, 1888.

Candidates
Daniel Gould Fowle, former Chairman of the North Carolina Democratic Party
Charles Manly Stedman, incumbent Lieutenant Governor
Sydenham Benoni Alexander, State Senator
Robert D. Gilmer
William H. Kitchin, former U.S. Representative
W.W. Fuller
Walter Clark, Judge of the North Carolina Superior Court
Richard H. Battle, Chairman of the North Carolina Democratic Party
Risden Tyler Bennett, former U.S. Representative

Results
The results of the balloting were as follows:

General election

Candidates
Major party candidates
Daniel Gould Fowle, Democratic
Oliver H. Dockery, Republican

Other candidates
William T. Walker, Prohibition

Results

References

1888
North Carolina
Gubernatorial